Paratrytone snowi, or Snow's skipper, is a species of grass skipper in the butterfly family Hesperiidae.

References

Further reading

 

Hesperiinae
Articles created by Qbugbot